Gwendoline See-Hian Yeo (born 10 July 1977) is a Singaporean actress, musician and writer best known for her roles as Dr. Kelly Lee on General Hospital, Xiao-Mei on Desperate Housewives and Sun Fu in Broken Trail. She is also known for voicing Domino on Wolverine and the X-Men, Shinigami on Nickelodeon's Teenage Mutant Ninja Turtles and Lady Shiva on Young Justice.

Film
Yeo starred opposite Robert Duvall and Thomas Haden Church in the Emmy Award-winning Western Broken Trail as Sun Fu (also known as "Number Three"), a Chinese woman sold into prostitution in the 1800s. After a worldwide search, Duvall personally selected her to star opposite him in the role. Her performance in the film earned her critical acclaim and a NAMIC Vision Award nomination for Best Actress in 2007.

In the independent film Heathens and Thieves, Yeo played Kun Hua, a role which garnered her Best Actress Awards at both the WorldFest Houston International Film Festival and the Iowa Film Festival.

Yeo also starred in the Emmy Award-nominated Amazon original special, American Girl: Ivy & Julie.

Other notable film roles include Dr. Samantha Yep in The Jane Austen Book Club with Emily Blunt and Hugh Dancy, June in Night Skies, and The Magic of Ordinary Days with Keri Russell.

Television
Yeo is perhaps best known for her recurring guest star role as Xiao-Mei, the Chinese maid of Gabrielle (Eva Longoria) and Carlos (Ricardo Antonio Chavira) in Desperate Housewives. The character's popularity in the series led to an offer for a series regular contract the next season.

Set to debut in the 2020–21 television season, Yeo was cast as a series regular on The CW's Kung Fu as Zhilan, a dangerous nemesis with criminal ties and a connection to the Shaolin monastery. Before the series aired, Yeo was replaced by Yvonne Chapman.
 
She also had a recurring role as the Oklahoma-born Sargent Richelle (opposite Felicity Huffman in the critically acclaimed series American Crime, played Kelly Lee on General Hospital, and has also guested on other popular shows such as NCIS, Grey's Anatomy, Castle, The Mentalist, and Chuck.

Voice acting
Yeo is a prominent voice artist in several animated series, films, video games, and commercials, and has multiple action figures based on her characters. She started her career in voice-over in 2003 with guest role on What's New, Scooby-Doo?. More recently, she voiced Lady Shiva in the 2019 animated series Young Justice, and Tsiao Jung in the 2019 Emmy Award-winning series, Love, Death & Robots.

Her character Shinigami, from Nickelodeon's Teenage Mutant Ninja Turtles, was officially launched during San Diego Comic-Con to a huge crowd of fans. In 2020, she voiced another iconic role from the TMNT universe, Karai, in Nickelodeon's Rise of the Teenage Mutant Ninja Turtles.

She has voiced several other popular animated characters including Nala Se, Jedi Kalifa, and Cato Parassiti in Star Wars: The Clone Wars, Domino in Wolverine and the X-Men, Li Mei in The Invincible Iron Man, Lola Chang in Batman: The Dark Knight Returns, Gramma on Stitch!, Mercy Graves in The Batman and Li-en in Zatch Bell!. She has also guest starred on Phineas and Ferb, Kim Possible and What's New, Scooby Doo?.

In video games, Yeo is best known as Paine in Final Fantasy X-2 and Kingdom Hearts II. She was also the female lead in SOCOM 4 U.S. Navy SEALs as the character Forty-Five. Other notable video game credits include Lady Deathstrike in X-Men: Next Dimension, Yuma in Far Cry 4, and Four-Eyes in Resident Evil: Operation Raccoon City.

Other projects
Yeo's love of music led her to specialize in playing the Chinese long zither, also known as the guzheng, which culminated into a one-woman radio show on NPR-KCRW about her immigrant and ugly duckling story.  It also included the debut of her first two zither/vocal tracks "Kiss My Grits" and "Lovers."

Her radio show evolved into a theater piece which Yeo wrote, scored, and starred in called Laughing With My Mouth Wide Open, which received rave reviews during its run at the El Centro Theatre.

Yeo also designed her own limited-edition clothing line, which quickly sold out, and donated the proceeds to Kentucky's Christian Appalachian Project.

Personal life
Born in Singapore, Yeo moved to California, United States as a teenager, where she attended St. Ignatius College Preparatory before graduating with honors in 1994. Yeo graduated from the University of California, Los Angeles in 1997 with summa cum laude. She also completed a diploma in classical piano at the San Francisco Conservatory of Music.

Yeo was crowned Miss Asian America in 1995 and was also named Miss Chinatown USA in 1998–99.

She is the niece of George Yeo, a Singaporean former politician who served as Minister for Foreign Affairs between 2004 and 2011.

Filmography

Live-action

Film

Television

Voice acting

Film

Television

Video games

References

External links

1977 births
Living people
Actresses from California
American actresses of Chinese descent
American film actresses
American musicians of Chinese descent
American soap opera actresses
American television actresses
American video game actresses
American voice actresses
Miss Asian America winners
Musicians from California
San Francisco Conservatory of Music alumni
Singaporean emigrants to the United States
Singaporean people of Chinese descent
University of California, Los Angeles alumni
21st-century American actresses